Paraswammerdamia ornichella is a moth of the family Yponomeutidae. It is found in Ukraine and Russia.

References

Moths described in 1960
Yponomeutidae